The One Thing is the ninth album by Michael Bolton, released on November 16, 1993. Although it produced the hit single "Said I Loved You...But I Lied", which reached number 6 in the US, it did not match the sales of his previous three albums. Nevertheless, the album was still a respectable hit on its own, reaching number 3 on the Billboard 200 and being certified triple platinum in the US. It was also certified Platinum in the United Kingdom.

Like his previous album, Bolton co-produced all the tracks and co-wrote all but two songs.

Track listing

Personnel 
 Michael Bolton – lead vocals, arrangements (3, 4, 8, 9)
 Phillip Nicholas – keyboards (1, 2), programming (1, 2, 7)
 Walter Afanasieff – arrangements (3, 4, 6, 8, 9), keyboards (3, 4, 6, 8, 9), synthesizers (3, 4, 6, 8, 9), synth bass (3, 4, 6, 8, 9), drum programming (3, 4, 6, 8, 9), rhythm programming (3, 4, 6, 8, 9), Hammond B3 organ (6)
 Gary Cirimelli – synthesizer programming (3, 4, 6, 8, 9), Macintosh programming (3, 4, 6, 8, 9), digital programming (4, 8, 9), backing vocals (9)
 Simon Franglen – additional synthesizer programming (3, 10)
 Ren Klyce – synthesizer programming (3, 6)
 David Foster – keyboards (5), arrangements (5), orchestra arrangements (5)
 Claude Gaudette – synthesizer programming (5)
 Randy Kerber – keyboards (10)
 Dann Huff – guitar (1, 2, 7), additional guitar (4), nylon guitar (4), guitar solo (9)
 Michael Landau – guitar (3, 4, 6, 8, 9)
 Michael Thompson – guitar (5)
 John Robinson – drums (5)
 Stephen "Doc" Kupka – baritone saxophone (6)
 Emilio Castillo – tenor saxophone (6)
 David Mann – tenor saxophone (6)
 Lee Thornburg – trombone (6), trumpet (6)
 Greg Adams – trumpet (6)
 Jeremy Lubbock – orchestra arrangements (5, 10) conductor (10)
 Joey Melotti – arrangements (6)
 Mutt Lange – backing vocals (1, 2, 7), rhythm guitar (7)
 Bridgette Bryant – backing vocals (3)
 Jim Gilstrap – backing vocals (3, 4, 6, 9)
 Pat Hawk – backing vocals (3, 4, 6, 7, 9)
 Dorian Holley – backing vocals (3, 4, 6, 9)
 Phillip Ingram – backing vocals (3, 4, 9)
 Van Johnson – backing vocals (3, 4, 6, 7, 9)
 Janis Liebhart – backing vocals (3, 4, 6, 7, 9)
 Johnny Britt – backing vocals (6)
 Portia Griffin – backing vocals (6)
 Phil Perry – backing vocals (6)
 Carmen Twillie – backing vocals (6)
 Mona Lisa Young – backing vocals (6)
 Patty Darcy – backing vocals (7)
 Stevie Vann – backing vocals (7)
 Skyler Jett – backing vocals (9)
 Claytoven Richardson – backing vocals (9)

Production 
 Producers – Michael Bolton (all tracks); Robert John "Mutt" Lange (Tracks 1, 2 & 7); Walter Afanasieff (Tracks 3, 4, 6, 8 & 9); David Foster (Tracks 5 & 10)
 Engineers – Dave Reitzas (Tracks 1-10); Dana Jon Chappelle (Tracks 3, 4, 6, 8 & 9); Jan Mullaney (Track 4, 6 & 8); Humberto Gatica (Track 5)
 Second Engineers – Max Hayes (Tracks 1, 2 & 7); Geoff Hunt (Tracks 1, 2 & 7); Stephen McNamara Tracks 1, 2 & 7); Kyle Bess (Tracks 3, 4, 6, 8 & 9); Craig Brock (Tracks 3, 4, 6, 8, & 9); Bill Leonard (Tracks 3, 4 & 6); Steve Milo (Tracks 3, 4, 6, 8 & 9); Michael Reiter (Tracks 4, 5, 9 & 10); Manny Maroquin (Track 9)
 Mixing – Dave Bascome (Tracks 1, 2 & 7); Mick Guzauski (Tracks 3 & 6); Dana Jon Chappelle (Track 4, 8 & 9); Al Schmitt (Tracks 5 & 10)
 Mixed at The Enterprise (Burbank, California); Record Plant (Los Angeles, California); Out of Pocket Productions
 Mastered by Vlado Meller at Sony Music Studio Operations (New York, New York)
 Art Direction – Christopher Austopchek
 Design – June Hong
 Photography – Timothy White
 Grooming – Nancy Sprague
 Stylist – Genina Aboittz

Charts

Certifications

References 

Michael Bolton albums
1993 albums
Albums produced by Robert John "Mutt" Lange
Albums produced by David Foster
Albums produced by Walter Afanasieff
Columbia Records albums